The North Bay Nugget is a newspaper published in North Bay, Ontario, Canada. The paper is currently owned by Postmedia.

The paper was launched in 1907 as the Cobalt Nugget, during the silver boom at Cobalt, Ontario. It was acquired by businessmen Harry Browning and W. G. Ferguson within a few months. Initially a weekly, it was expanded into a daily paper in 1909, and Browning was a founding member of Canadian Press when that cooperative was founded in 1917. Following the end of the Cobalt boom, Browning moved the paper to North Bay in 1921; he then sold it to W. E. Mason, the owner of the Sudbury Star, in 1922, and moved to Sudbury in 1927 to become managing editor of the Star. Mason remained the Nugget's owner until his death in 1948, following which an employee buyout purchased it from his estate. It was acquired by Southam Newspapers in 1956.

Southam acquired the Thomson Newspapers chain in 1996, reuniting the Nugget and the Star under common ownership. The papers were both sold to Osprey Media in 2001, and to Sun Media in 2007. In 2015, Postmedia acquired Sun Media.

See also
List of newspapers in Canada

References

External links
 

Mass media in North Bay, Ontario
Postmedia Network publications
Daily newspapers published in Ontario
Publications established in 1907
1907 establishments in Ontario